The Bay Institute(TBI) is a nonprofit research, education, and advocacy organization dedicated to protecting and restoring the ecosystem of the San Francisco Bay, the Sacramento-San Joaquin Delta, and the estuary's tributary rivers, streams, and watersheds. Created in 1981, TBI's scientific experts have worked to secure stronger protections for endangered species and their habitats; improve water quality; reform how California manages its water resources; and promote comprehensive ecological restoration from the Sierra to the sea. They are based in Novato, California. Aquarium of the Bay in San Francisco is affiliated with them.

References

External links

San Francisco Bay
1981 establishments in California
Research institutes in the San Francisco Bay Area
Environmental organizations based in the San Francisco Bay Area